"Watching and Waiting" is a 1969 single by the progressive rock band the Moody Blues, and was written by band members Justin Hayward and Ray Thomas.

Release
The song was first released as a single in October 1969, and was later released in November 1969 on the album To Our Children's Children's Children.

Interviewed in 2014, the song's vocalist Justin Hayward said:
I think To Our Children’s Children’s Children [1969] is the one Moodies album that didn't come across on the radio. It didn't jump; it was soft, it was quiet. Everybody was so delicate with it and handling it with kid gloves. The way it was mastered was quiet, and the way it was transferred to disc was delicate. In the end, it ended up getting a little lost. Watching and Waiting — when we heard that song in its studio beauty, we thought, "This is it! All of those people who had been saying to us for the past 3 or 4 years, "You'll probably just do another Nights in White Satin with it" — no! We had shivers up the spine, and that kind of stuff. But when it came out and you heard it on the radio, you kept saying, "Turn it up! Turn it up!! Oh no, it’s not going to make it." So it didn’t happen.

Personnel
 Justin Hayward – vocals, acoustic guitar
 Mike Pinder – Mellotron, piano
 Ray Thomas – flute
 John Lodge – double bass
 Graeme Edge – drums, percussion

References

1969 singles
The Moody Blues songs
Songs written by Justin Hayward
Songs written by Ray Thomas
1969 songs